A genootschap (German - genossenschaft) is a specifically Dutch form of company, association, society or cooperative, named after the pursuit for which its members gather.

Definition

Each member voluntarily joins his or her fate with that of his or her fellow members and that of the genootschap's ups and downs.  Such a society also usually has a number of other characteristics :

Size and composition:  The number of members of a society is limited.  A society can be sizeable, but it is never a mass association.  Thus its intentions are decided only by its character.  
Objective:  The target of a genootschap is always carried forward by its members with a certain degree of seriousness, as well as a great social aim.  From this also results its solemn character and interest in decorum.

Kinds
 Discreet genootschap
 Geheim genootschap
 Initiatiegenootschap
 Wetenschappelijk genootschap

Examples
 Republikeins Genootschap
 Nieuw Republikeins Genootschap
 Koninklijk Nederlands Aardrijkskundig Genootschap
 Theosofisch Genootschap
 Russisch Geografisch Genootschap
 Met Tijd en Vlijt
 Kerlinga
 Genootschap Onze Taal
 Theosofisch Genootschap Point Loma-Covina
 Koninklijk Nederlands Geologisch Mijnbouwkundig Genootschap
 Bataafs Genootschap voor Proefondervindelijke wijsbegeerte
 Thule Gesellschaft
 Genootschap Kunstliefde
 Actuarieel Genootschap
 Het Apostolisch Genootschap
 Genootschap der Vrienden
 Koninklijk Zeeuws Genootschap der Wetenschappen
 Theosofisch Genootschap Pasadena
 Louis Couperus Genootschap
 Nederlandsch Zendeling Genootschap
 Natuurhistorisch Genootschap Limburg

Clubs and societies in the Netherlands

de:Genossenschaft